The Parish of St. Rita of Cascia and of St. Pius V is a Roman Catholic parish under the authority of the Roman Catholic Archdiocese of New York. The church is located at 448 College Ave. in the Bronx.

St Rita of Cascia
The parish was founded in 1900. Rita of Cascia was canonized on May 24, 1900, and Archbishop Corrigan decided to name the parish in honor of the new saint. The cornerstone was laid in November 1900 and the church was consecrated in October 1904. The first pastor was Rev. Charles Ferina D.D. He was assisted by Rev. Patrick Mannion and Rev. A.D. Cunion. During his tenure, Rev. Ferina founded an Italian mission at 150th St. and Morris Ave. that later became the parish of Our Lady of Suffrage.

A residence of the Missionaries of Charity is located at St. Rita.

Pastors
 Fr. Charles Ferina, 1900-1909
 James P. O'Brien, 1910 -
Fr. Bergin 1940-1947

Merger
Effective August 1, 2015, the parish of St. Pius V merged with the parish of St. Rita of Cascia.

St Pius V

The parish was established in 1906, with Fr. Francis M. Fagan its first pastor. "A 'fine' parish school was opened September 1913.

Building
The red-brick church was built in 1906–1907 to the designs by Anthony F. A. Schmitt. The Romanesque building has two towers. Effective November 30, 2017, the St. Pius V church building was desacralized for secular use.

St. Pius V Girls' High School

St. Pius V Girls' High School was opened in 1930 and closed effective June 2011.

References 

Christian organizations established in 1906
Roman Catholic churches in the Bronx
Roman Catholic churches completed in 1907
Defunct schools in New York City
1906 establishments in New York City
Mott Haven, Bronx
Catholic elementary schools in the Bronx
Private middle schools in the Bronx
20th-century Roman Catholic church buildings in the United States